Serena Sheridan (born  27 August 1985) is a New Zealand professional racing cyclist.

Career highlights

2007
 1st, Overall, Tour de Vineyards
 Winner Stages 2,3 & 4

2008
 1st in Le Race (NZL)
 1st, Overall, Tour de Vineyards
 Winner Stages 1,3 & 4
 1st, Coromandel K1 Elite (NZL)

2009
 1st overall Tour de Vineyards
1st stage 2
2nd stages 1 & 3

References

External links

Tour de Vineyards 2007
Tour de Vineyards 2008

1985 births
Living people
New Zealand female cyclists
Sportspeople from Nelson, New Zealand